WNES (1050 AM) is a classic country-formatted radio station that is licensed to and located in Central City, Kentucky, United States. The station is currently owned by Starlight Broadcasting Co., Inc.

The station’s studio (shared with sister station WKYA) and transmitter is located on Everly Brothers Boulevard (U.S. Highway 62) near the Western Kentucky Parkway underpass southwest of Central City.

History 
On September 8, 1954, Muhlenberg Broadcasting Company was granted a construction permit by the FCC. The station began broadcasting on January 1, 1955, as the first radio station to broadcast in Muhlenberg County, Kentucky. The station was a 500 watt daytime-only station broadcasting at 1600 kilocycles. The station reallocated to its current frequency of 1050 kilocycles in August 1960. 

In March 2013, the station’s owner, Starlight Broadcasting, was renamed Radio Active Media, Inc. The station’s programming was simulcast on the FM dial via WNES-FM (now WEKV) from that station’s 1956 inception until December 1981. In September 2014, the FM simulcast of WNES returned when the station launched a Class D low-power FM translator, W284AO, broadcasting a frequency of 104.7 megahertz with 250 watts of power.

Coverage area 
The station’s daytime signal covers Muhlenberg and surrounding counties, plus the Owensboro and Henderson area. Its nighttime signal coverage is greatly reduced to avoid co-frequency interference with other AM 1050 stations. W284AO signal covers all of Muhlenberg County, along with portions of its neighboring counties.

References

External links

 

NES
Radio stations established in 1955
Country radio stations in the United States 
Muhlenberg County, Kentucky
1955 establishments in Kentucky
Central City, Kentucky